George Henry Connor (1822–1 May 1883, the Deanery, Windsor) was a Church of England clergyman who became Dean of Windsor.

Family 
He was the eldest son of George Connor, master in chancery in Ireland.  He married Maude Worthington in 1852, eldest daughter of John Worthington of Kent House, Southsea.  The couple had two sons and several daughters, of which Emily Henrietta married another clergyman, Ernest Roland Wilberforce.

Life 
He graduated BA in 1845 and proceeded MA in 1851 at Trinity College, Dublin, and was ordained deacon in 1846 and priest in 1847. He officiated for a time at St Thomas's Chapel, Newport, Isle of Wight.  He was then curate at St Jude's, Southsea then Wareham, Dorset, before returning to Newport as vicar in 1852, where his drive and initiative got the parish church rebuilt for £22,000 (with Prince Albert laying the foundation stone), a new vicarage and almshouses built, and local schools improved.

Developing a relationship with Queen Victoria, residing mainly at nearby Osborne House at this time, he became for many years her honorary chaplain and chaplain-in-ordinary, chaplain to the governor of the Isle of Wight, and official and commissary of the archdeaconry of Wight, culminating in his appointment as Dean of Windsor in October 1882 by the queen herself, without consulting Gladstone.  Connor departed from Newport, to the parishioners' general regret, but proved unsuited to the pressures of such a prominent deanery as Windsor.  His health rapidly failed (his presence at the christening of Princess Alice of Albany on 26 March 1883 took a great effort) and though he preached often in the private chapel, he only preached once in St George's Chapel before dying in office in 1883.

Sources 
 DNB entry

1822 births
1883 deaths
Alumni of Trinity College Dublin
Deans of Windsor